Love Gun is the sixth studio album by American hard rock band Kiss, released on June 30, 1977. Casablanca Records and FilmWorks shipped one million copies of the album on this date. It was certified platinum and became the band's first top 5 album on the Billboard 200. The album was remastered in 1997 and again in 2014.

Overview
Love Gun is the first Kiss studio album to feature a lead vocal performance from Ace Frehley, making it the first to feature lead vocal performances from all four band members. It was also the last studio album to feature Peter Criss on every song, as he was replaced by session drummer Anton Fig for all but one song on 1979's Dynasty. Before Love Gun was completed, a Gallup poll indicated that Kiss was the most popular band in the United States, beating Aerosmith, Led Zeppelin and the Eagles. On August 26, 27 and 28, 1977, Kiss recorded three shows at the LA Forum for their next release, their second live album Alive II.

The album cover was painted by fantasy artist Ken Kelly, who previously contributed the cover for 1976's Destroyer. A cardboard "Love Gun" (assembly required) was included inside the album, along with a Kiss merchandise order form.

Songs
"I Stole Your Love"
Stanley has said the song "came quickly. It was kind of like the sister song to Love Gun. Swagger and attitude. That song was influenced in some ways by the Deep Purple song Burn.”

"Christine Sixteen"
Then-unknown guitarist Eddie Van Halen and drummer Alex Van Halen played on the demo of this song, as well as "Got Love for Sale". The lyrics have a similar theme to "Goin' Blind" from Hotter than Hell; both songs involve older men lusting after underage girls. It was sampled by Tone Loc on "Funky Cold Medina".

"Shock Me"
The song was inspired by an event that took place during Kiss's Rock and Roll Over tour when Frehley suffered an electric shock. On December 12, 1976, Kiss performed a concert at the Lakeland Civic Center in Lakeland, Florida. During the opening song, Frehley touched an ungrounded metal staircase railing. He was knocked backward, and the concert was delayed for 30 minutes. The show was eventually completed, and Frehley lost feeling in his hand for the remainder of the concert.

This was the first lead vocal that Frehley recorded. In his autobiography, he states that he originally intended for Gene Simmons to sing the song, but the bassist encouraged Frehley to try it himself. Frehley recorded his lead vocal part while lying on the floor of the studio because he liked the added pressure on his chest.

"Tomorrow and Tonight"
The song was written to try to recapture the feeling of "Rock and Roll All Nite", but never reached the success of the aforementioned hit. A soundcheck recording of the song appears on Alive II. The song was never played live by the band until Kiss Kruise VII in November 2017.

"Love Gun"
The title song has been played on every Kiss tour since its release. Stanley has cited it as the Kiss song he is the proudest of writing. It was the first song that he wrote, arranged, and produced in its entirety. The song shares many of its lyrics with "The Hunter", written by Booker T. & the M.G.'s, and originally recorded by Albert King. In his autobiography Face the Music, Stanley acknowledges the derivation: "I stole the idea of a 'love gun' from Albert King's version of 'The Hunter,' which Zeppelin also nicked from for 'How Many More Times' on their first album."

"Plaster Caster"
The song was inspired by Cynthia Plaster Caster, a former groupie famous for casting penises of famous rock musicians, such as Jimi Hendrix.

"Then She Kissed Me"
The track is one of several gender-reversed covers of the Crystals' 1963 single "Then He Kissed Me".

Reissues
Love Gun was reissued for the first time in 1985. The reissue included the original artwork, and while it featured a plain sleeve the jacket still contained a reference for the original color sleeve. The first 10,000 pressings contained label errors: specifically, the third track of the 'A' side was listed as "Plaster Caster" but played as "Got Love for Sale", and the 'B' side track listings were completely out of order.

Love Gun was remastered and reissued in 1997 as part of the Kiss Remasters series.

It was remastered and reissued in a deluxe edition on October 28, 2014, with sleeve notes by Def Leppard's Joe Elliott and a second disc containing demos, live rarities, and a 1977 interview with Gene Simmons. All tracks on the second disc were previously unreleased, bar the demo of "Reputation", which had appeared on the compilation Kiss 40 a few months earlier. The three live tracks were recorded at the Capital Center in Landover, Maryland on December 20, 1977. "The potential for this to be the greatest deluxe edition of all time," noted music writer Geoff Barton, "is ruined by a too-clean remastering job – plus, if truth be told, a track that has dated badly in 'Christine Sixteen'."

Track listings
All credits adapted from the original release.

Personnel
Kiss
Paul Stanley – vocals, rhythm guitar, first guitar solo on "I Stole Your Love", bass on "Love Gun"
Gene Simmons – vocals, bass; rhythm guitar on "Christine Sixteen" and "Got Love for Sale"
Peter Criss – drums, vocals
Ace Frehley – lead guitar, vocals; all guitars and bass on "Shock Me"

Additional personnel
Eddie Kramer – keyboards on "I Stole Your Love", "Christine Sixteen", "Love Gun"
Tasha Thomas, Ray Simpson, and Hilda Harris − backing vocals on "Tomorrow and Tonight"
Jimmy Maelen – conga drums on "Almost Human"

Production
 Eddie Kramer – producer, engineer
 Corky Stasiak – engineer
 Dennis Woloch – design
 Ken Kelly – cover art
 David Spindel – photography

Charts

Singles

Certifications

References

External links
 

Kiss (band) albums
1977 albums
Albums produced by Eddie Kramer
Albums recorded at Record Plant (New York City)
Casablanca Records albums
Albums with cover art by Ken Kelly (artist)